The discography of Lloyd Banks, an American rapper, consists of five studio albums, sixteen mixtapes, eleven singles and one soundtrack. His music has been released on the record labels Interscope Records and 50 Cent's G-Unit Records.

Albums

Studio albums

Mixtapes

Singles

As lead artist

As featured artist

Promotional singles

Other charted songs

Guest appearances

Remixes

Music videos

References 

Hip hop discographies
Discographies of American artists